Konai Helu Thaman (born 1946) is a poet and academic from Tonga.

Career 
Between 1969 and 1972, Thaman was a teacher in Tonga. She has worked at the University of the South Pacific since 1974 and currently holds a Personal Chair in Pacific Education and Culture, a position she has held since its establishment in 1998. She has also held management positions at the university including Director of the Institute of Education, Head of the School of Humanities, and Pro-vice-chancellor.

As an academic researcher, Thaman has been widely published, with a focus on education (including indigenous and teacher education), curriculum development, and sustainable development (with a focus on the Pacific context).

Thaman has held several positions with UNESCO. Between 1998–2006 she was the UNESCO Chair in Teacher Education and Culture. She is currently a Fellow of the Asia-Pacific Programme of Educational Innovation for Development and member of the Committee of Experts on the Application of the Recommendation concerning the Status of Teachers.

Works by Thaman have been used in primary and secondary education across the Pacific region.

Selected poetry by Thaman was included in UPU, a curation of Pacific Island writers’ work which was first presented at the Silo Theatre as part of the Auckland Arts Festival in March 2020. UPU was remounted as part of the Kia Mau Festival in Wellington, New Zealand in June 2021.

Her poems have been translated into multiple languages, including German by Renate von Gizyckia, in the collection of poems titled Inselfeuer (Reihe Literatur des Pazifik, 1986). Her poems are also in several anthologies including Fire in the Sea: An Anthology of Poetry and Art and Nuanua: Pacific Writing in English since 1980.

Published works

Poetry collections
 Songs of Love (Mana Publications, 1999)
 Kakala (Mana Publications, 1993)
 Hingano (Mana Publications, 1987)
 Langakali (Mana Publications, 1981)
 You the choice of my parents (Mana Publications, 1974)

Honours
National honours
  Order of Queen Sālote Tupou III, Grand Cross (31 July 2008).

References

Further reading 
 Women in South Pacific literature: An interview with Konai Helu Thaman, World Literature Written in English (1978), Volume 17, Issue 1, pp. 263–267

1946 births
Living people
Tongan academics
Tongan writers
Tongan women writers
People educated at Epsom Girls' Grammar School
University of Auckland alumni
University of California, Santa Barbara alumni
University of the South Pacific alumni
Academic staff of the University of the South Pacific
People from Nukuʻalofa
20th-century Tongan writers
21st-century Tongan writers
20th-century Tongan women
21st-century Tongan women
20th-century Tongan people
21st-century Tongan people
20th-century women writers
21st-century women writers
Dames Grand Cross of the Order of Queen Sālote Tupou III